Defending champions Henri Kontinen and John Peers successfully defended their title, defeating Łukasz Kubot and Marcelo Melo in the final, 6–4, 6–2 to win the doubles tennis title at the 2017 ATP Finals.

Melo secured the year-end world No. 1 doubles ranking for the second time when he and Kubot won their first round-robin match.

Seeds

Alternates

Draw

Finals

Woodbridge/Woodforde group
Standings are determined by: 1. number of wins; 2. number of matches; 3. in two-players-ties, head-to-head records; 4. in three-players-ties, percentage of sets won, then percentage of games won, then head-to-head records; 5. ATP rankings.

Eltingh/Haarhuis group
Standings are determined by: 1. number of wins; 2. number of matches; 3. in two-players-ties, head-to-head records; 4. in three-players-ties, percentage of sets won, then percentage of games won, then head-to-head records; 5. ATP rankings.

References

External links
Official Website
Main Draw Doubles

Doubles